First Presbyterian Church of Ulysses is a historic Presbyterian church located at Trumansburg in Tompkins County, New York. It is an imposing temple front Greek Revival style structure built in 1849–1850.  The church is a 61 feet by 57 feet, gable roofed brick structure that is dominated by a monumental, pedimented portico supported by five massive, fluted Doric order columns.  A tripartite bell tower crowns the roof ridge.

It was listed on the National Register of Historic Places in 1999.

Gallery

References

External links

First Presbyterian Church of Ulysses website
 First Presbyterian Church of Ulysses, East Main Street, Trumansburg, Tompkins County, NY: 12 photos, 1 data page, 2 photo caption pages and 1 color transparency at Historic American Buildings Survey
 First Presbyterian Church of Ulysses, Meeting Hall, East Main Street, Trumansburg, Tompkins County, NY: 3 photos, 1 data page, and 1 photo caption pages at Historic American Buildings Survey

Historic American Buildings Survey in New York (state)
Churches on the National Register of Historic Places in New York (state)
Presbyterian churches in New York (state)
Greek Revival church buildings in New York (state)
Churches completed in 1850
19th-century Presbyterian church buildings in the United States
Churches in Tompkins County, New York
National Register of Historic Places in Tompkins County, New York
1850 establishments in New York (state)